Vincent William Woolf (21 April 1907 – 10 May 1959) was an Australian rules footballer who played with Hawthorn in the Victorian Football League (VFL).

Notes

External links 

1907 births
1959 deaths
Australian rules footballers from Melbourne
Hawthorn Football Club players
People from Carlton North, Victoria